Alestes stuhlmannii is a species of fish in the family Alestidae. It is endemic to the Ulanga River in Morogoro Region of Tanzania.

Named in honor of Franz Stuhlmann (1863-1928),  a German zoologist and African explorer, who collected the type specimen in Tanzania.

References

External links
 Froese, R. and D. Pauly, eds. Alestes stuhlmannii. FishBase. 2015.

Alestes
Fish of Tanzania
Fish described in 1896
Taxa named by Georg Johann Pfeffer
Taxonomy articles created by Polbot